Daniel Cox and Daniel Smethurst are the defending champions, but chose not to participate this year.

Dean O'Brien and Ruan Roelofse won the title defeating Daniel Nguyen and Dennis Novikov in the final, 6–1, 7–6(7–0).

Seeds

Draw

Draw

References
 Main Draw

Levene Gouldin and Thompson Tennis Challenger - Doubles
2015 Doubles
2015 Levene Gouldin & Thompson Tennis Challenger